Lampsilis ornata is a species of freshwater mussel, an aquatic bivalve mollusk in the family Unionidae, the river mussels.

This species is endemic to the United States.

References

Molluscs of the United States
ornata
Bivalves described in 1835
Taxa named by Timothy Abbott Conrad
Taxonomy articles created by Polbot